The Mexican Institute of Industrial Property (IMPI) is the patent and trademark administration body of Mexico.

See also
 Intellectual property law in Mexico

References

External links
  

Mexican intellectual property law
Patent offices